Jan Abaza and Melanie Oudin were the defending champions, but Oudin chose not to compete. Abaza partnered Amra Sadiković, but they lost in the first round to Tamira Paszek and Anna Tatishvili.

The top seeds Paula Cristina Gonçalves and Sanaz Marand won the title, defeating Paszek and Tatishvili in the final, 4–6, 6–2, [10–3].

Seeds

Draw

References 
 Draw

Coleman Vision Tennis Championships - Doubles